Jason Barnes (born April 11, 1984) is a professional Canadian football wide receiver in the Canadian Football League who is currently a free agent. He was originally signed by the Central Valley Coyotes as a free agent in 2007. He then played for three seasons with the Edmonton Eskimos, followed by another three seasons with the Toronto Argonauts. He played college football for the Sacramento State Hornets.

Personal life
His older brother, Matt Barnes, is a former NBA player. On November 27, 2007, his mother Anne died from stage 4 lung cancer.

References

External links
Canadian Football League stats

1984 births
Living people
American players of Canadian football
American football wide receivers
Canadian football wide receivers
Central Valley Coyotes players
Edmonton Elks players
Sacramento State Hornets football players
Toronto Argonauts players
Players of American football from San Jose, California
Players of Canadian football from San Jose, California